Fat Chef is a reality show on the Food Network, which premiered on January 26, 2012.

Cast
 Christine Avanti
 Robert Brace
 Brett Hoebel

Episodes

References

External links
 Official Page
 Fat Chef on Internet Movie Database
 Fat Chef on TV.com

2012 American television series debuts
2010s American reality television series
2012 American television series endings
Food Network original programming